U20 or U-20 may refer to:

 Under-20 athletics
 German submarine U-20
 U-20 Summit, an international summit for cities from the G-20 countries
 An under-20 sports teams or competition including:
Association football
 FIFA U-20 World Cup
 FIFA U-20 Women's World Cup
:Category:Under-20 association football, one of many under-20 association football (soccer) teams and competition
Ice hockey
IIHF World U20 Championship, an annual event organized by the International Ice Hockey Federation (IIHF) for national under-20 ice hockey teams from around the world